The Canadian Fraternal Association (CFA) was (see: https://www.ic.gc.ca/app/scr/cc/CorporationsCanada/fdrlCrpDtls.html?corpId=3091741) a trade association based in Waterloo, Ontario, for fraternal benefit societies in Canada which engaged in advocacy on their behalf as well as provided services.

History 

Fraternal benefit societies became popular in Canada in the 1870s and 1880s, representing a quarter of all the insurance sold in Canada by the time the CFA was founded in 1891.

The original goal of the Association was to promote the financial solvency of its members, a goal that became more important after federal and provincial governments passed laws that required them to adopt sounder actuarial policies in the first decade of the twentieth century.

By 1979 fraternal benefit societies only represented two percent of all life insurance sold in Canada. Nevertheless, the eighteen fraternal orders that made up the CFA accounted for ninety percent of all Canadian fraternalists.

The organization was founded in 1891, at which time nearly a quarter of all life insurance in Canada was sold by fraternal organizations. That percentage had declined by tenfold by 1997.

It represents fraternal organizations with approximately 400,000 Canadian members. These fraternal organizations offer financial products and services such as insurance, savings and investment vehicles as well as educational programs, volunteer services and social activities.

See also 
American Fraternal Alliance

References

Further reading 

 ; Former president of Canadian Fraternal Association
 
 ;  of the Independent Order of Foresters (and Orange Order who was also the first president of the Canadian Fraternal Association.
 ; Biography of insurance regulator who was called the "father of fraternalism in Ontario" at a 1910 meeting of the Canadian Fraternal Association.
Testimony of the Canadian Fraternal Association before the Banking Committee of the Senate of Canada

1891 establishments in Ontario
Mutual organizations
Organizations established in 1891
Organizations based in Ontario